The 1965–66 season was Fussball Club Basel 1893's 72nd season in their existence. It was their 20th consecutive season in the top flight of Swiss football after their promotion in the 1945–46 season. They played their home games either in the traditional stadium Landhof or in their new venue the St. Jakob Stadium. Lucien Schmidlin was club chairman for the fourth consecutive year.

Overview

Pre-season
To the beginning of the season Helmut Benthaus transferred in from 1. FC Köln and became player-coach. He replaced Jiří Sobotka as team manager, who went on to manage the Swiss national team. Benthaus was a graduate of the German Sport University Cologne and an experienced player trainer. Two seasons earlier Benthaus had won the 1963–64 Bundesliga as player-manager with Köln. Benthaus used his first season with Basel to observe, feel and classify. One of the biggest changes that he made, with the agreement of the board of directors, was introduce semi-professionalism.

There were only a few minor changes to the squad, Rade Ognjanović transferred to Grenchen and Heinz Sartor transferred  to Offenburger FV. Three players stepped back from Nationalliga A football, Carlo Porlezza, Mario Grava and Fernando Von Krannichfeldt went to play for the reserve team. As replacements three youngsters came from the youth team and three more from the reserve team.

Domestic league
Fourteen teams contested the 1965–66 Nationalliga A. These were the top 12 teams from the previous 1964–65 season and the two newly promoted teams Urania Genève Sport and Young Fellows Zürich. Basel finished the season in sixth position with 27 points. They ended the championship with ten wins, seven draws and nine defeats in their 26 matches. They scored 64 goals and conceded 57. Top league goal scorer was Roberto Frigerio with 15 goals, ahead of Karl Odermatt who scored 11 and Helmut Hauser with 10 goals. Basel played 15 Test games, winning ten, one draw and losing four. Roberto 'Mucho' Frigerio was also the top scorer in these games, with 16 goals in just 13 games. Alone in the match against Black Stars Basel he managed to net the ball six times.

Swiss Cup
In the Swiss Cup Basel started in the round of 32 on 7 November 1965, with a home win against Biel-Bienne. In the next round they played at home against Luzern with a 3–1 win. In the next round they were drawn away in the Wankdorf Stadium, Bern, against Young Boys. This ended in a 2–1 victory. In the semi-final they were drawn at home against Servette but were defeated 1–3. Zürich won the final and completed the double.

Inter-Cities Fairs Cup
In the 1965–66 Inter-Cities Fairs Cup Basel were drawn against Spanish team Valencia, but were beaten twice. In the Cup of the Alps Basel were drawn in the same group as Catania, S.S.C. Napoli, Juventus and Spal Ferrara. All four games ended in a defeat.

Players 

 

 
 
 

 
 
 
 
 
 
 

 
 
 

 
 

 

 
 

Players who left the squad

Results 
Legend

Friendly matches

Pre-season

Winter break and mid-season

Nationalliga A

League matches

League standings

Swiss Cup

Legend

Inter-Cities Fairs Cup

Second Round

Valencia won 8–2 on aggregate.

Cup of the Alps

Matches

Standings

See also
 History of FC Basel
 List of FC Basel players
 List of FC Basel seasons

References

Notes

Sources 
 Rotblau: Jahrbuch Saison 2014/2015. Publisher: FC Basel Marketing AG. 
 Die ersten 125 Jahre. Publisher: Josef Zindel im Friedrich Reinhardt Verlag, Basel. 
 FCB team 1965–66 at fcb-archiv.ch
 Switzerland 1965–66 at RSSSF
 Fairs Cup 1965-66 at RSSSF

External links 
 FC Basel official site

FC Basel seasons
Basel